Mudda – The Issue is a 2003 Hindi drama film. This movie is a directorial debut of actor director Saurabh Shukla and produced by Raju Mavani. The film features an ensemble cast where director himself played a role in the film.

Plot
Perplexed, and frustrated with life in Bombay's corrupt colleges, Lecturer Siddharth Archarya, decides to re-locate to a small town called Samaypur, where he feels he will get some satisfaction in teaching youngsters who are not influenced by politics. Alas, he is wrong. Student union rivalry and hatred has encompassed the entire town, fights break out frequently, mostly between two rival student leaders, Pratap and Rajbir, who are children of local political leaders, Harphool Singh and MLA Balli Tai. Siddharth decides to garner their energy in a positive way by making them renovate the college building - with disastrous results - and no hopes for a reconciliation. Things get even more complicated when both young men fall for a fellow collegian, Sundari, who wants to marry Pratap. It is then the parents of both Rajbir and Pratap meet secretly - and decide what their sons' and Samaypur's fate is going to be.

Cast
Arya Babbar as Rajbir 
Prashant Narayanan as Pratap Singh 
Rekha Vedavyas as Sundari
Aditya Srivastava as Harphool Singh
Dolly Ahluwalia as MLA Balli Tai
Vijay Raaz as Lemur
Pankaj Jha
Saurabh Shukla as Dinanath
Rajat Kapoor as Siddharth Acharya
Nawazuddin Siddiqui

Music

The music of the film is composed by Jeet Gannguli and Pritam while the lyrics are written by Chandrani Gannguli, Saurabh Shukla and Sanjay Swami.

Reception
Taran Adarsh of IndiaFM gave the film 1.5 stars out of 5, writing ″Director Saurabh Shukla is a fairly good story teller, but he seems to have got confused midway, whether to make a realistic film or a love triangle, with songs aplenty. On the technical side, the cinematography is just about okay. Dialogues are well penned at places, especially the ones delivered by the two warring politicians.″

References

External links

2000s Hindi-language films
Films featuring songs by Pritam
Films scored by Jeet Ganguly
2003 films
2003 directorial debut films